The following is a list of SkyWest Airlines destinations.

Delta Connection

Alaska Airlines
In February 2011, Alaska Airlines announced an agreement under which SkyWest Airlines began operating six of its West Coast routes starting in May 2011.  They are operating Twenty ERJ-175s and two CRJ-700s purchased from Horizon Air under a capacity purchase agreement.  This meant that SkyWest owned and operated the aircraft, while Alaska Airlines was responsible for marketing and selling tickets for the flights.  The ERJ-175s are operating on routes that would not be feasible to operate with either Bombardier Q400s nor Boeing 737s. SkyWest Airlines operates the following destinations for Alaska Airlines, as of March 2020:

United Express

Terminated destinations

Terminated as AirTran Airways

Indiana
Indianapolis – Indianapolis International Airport

Iowa
Des Moines – Des Moines International Airport

Missouri
St. Louis – Lambert International Airport

Nebraska
Omaha – Eppley Airfield

Ohio
Akron-Canton – Akron-Canton Regional Airport

Pennsylvania
Pittsburgh – Pittsburgh International Airport

Wisconsin
Milwaukee – Milwaukee Mitchell International Airport Hub

Terminated as Continental Connection

Arkansas
Texarkana – Texarkana Regional-Webb Field - The airport also serves Texarkana, Texas

Louisiana
Monroe – Monroe Regional Airport

Texas
NOTE: For Texarkana, Texas, see "Arkansas" as the airport is located in Arkansas
Abilene – Abilene Regional Airport
Beaumont – Southeast Texas Regional Airport
College Station – Easterwood Airport
Houston – George Bush Intercontinental Airport Hub
Killeen – Killeen-Fort Hood Regional Airport
San Angelo – Mathis Field
Tyler – Tyler Pounds Regional Airport
Victoria – Victoria Regional Airport (Essential Air Service)
Waco – Waco Regional Airport

Terminated as Delta Connection

Arizona
Page – Page Municipal Airport (Essential Air Service)

Table of SkyWest Airlines Destinations (July 2022)
SkyWest Airlines flies to more North American cities than any other commercial airline.  Below is a table of destinations and the major airline partner SkyWest Airlines operates these markets for.

References

Lists of airline destinations